Bienvenida Esperanza is a Venezuelan telenovela developed by Fausto Verdial and produced by Radio Caracas Televisión in 1983. This telenovela lasted 55 episodes and was distributed internationally by Coral International.

Mayra Alejandra and Carlos Olivier starred as the main protagonists.

Synopsis 
Esperanza is a middle-class girl whose family makes a fortune on the racetrack. Esperanza meets José María, the son of a rich merchant, and they fall in love. He is already engaged, and, when faced with a choice, he decides to marry his fiancé, leaving Esperanza disillusioned and pregnant. Her father throws her out of the house, but Jacinto, who grew up with her, proposes to marry her and raise the child as his own. She accepts.

Meanwhile, José María's marriage is over, and he tries to go back to Esperanza and their son. When she does not immediately reject him, Jacinto becomes cold and harsh towards her and only then does Esperanza begins to love him.

Cast

Mayra Alejandra as Esperanza Acuña
Carlos Olivier as Jacinto Nuñez
Felix Loreto as Julio Mendizábal
Tatiana Capote as Mariana Trías
Yanis Chimaras as Gabriel Iñesta
Flavio Caballero as José María Delgado
Hilda Abrahamz as Yoselin Mendizábal
Hazel Leal as Anaminta Acuña
Julio Alcázar - Eleazar Vargas
Ernesto Balzi as Johnny
Víctor Cámara as Gerardo Aparicio
Carlos Márquez as Justo Mendizábal
Aroldo Betancourt as Iván
 as Amanda
Elba Escobar as Zoraida de García
Gladys Caceres as Teodora Mendizábal
América Barrios as Mercedes de Trias
Hazel Leal as Anaminta 
Mahuampi Acosta as Remedios Aparicio
Alberto Marín as Tomás Acuña
Dilia Waikarán as Emilia de Acuña
Alicia Plaza as Meliza Acuña
Leopoldo Regnault as Alejandro
Yajaira Paredes as Eloísa "Viki"
Carlos Villamizar as Joaquín Robles

References

External links
Bienvenida Esperanza at the Internet Movie Database
Opening credits

1983 telenovelas
RCTV telenovelas
Venezuelan telenovelas
1983 Venezuelan television series debuts
1983 Venezuelan television series endings
Spanish-language telenovelas
Television shows set in Caracas